Piblange (Lorraine Franconian Piwléngen) is a commune in the Moselle department in Grand Est in north-eastern France. 
Localities of the commune: Saint-Bernard, Bockange, Drogny (lf: Drechéngen).

See also
 Communes of the Moselle department

References

External links
 

Communes of Moselle (department)